Daniel Dalton Sargeant (born March 25, 1998) is an American professional stock car racing driver. He last competed full-time in the NASCAR Craftsman Truck Series, driving the No. 25 Chevrolet Silverado for GMS Racing. He was the 2016 ARCA Racing Series Rookie of the Year, and finished second in the ARCA point standings in 2017.

Racing career

Early years
Sargeant began his career at age nine, racing karts as well as bandoleros, with dreams of pursuing both a stock car and open wheel career. In 2012 at the age of 13, Sargeant and his brother moved to Switzerland to compete in European open wheel series. He scored wins in the WSK Euro Series and the CIK-FIA European KF3 Championship, and tested a Formula Renault car.

After returning to the United States in 2014, Sargeant competed in late models for Lee Pulliam Performance and Wauters Motorsports, scoring several victories including one at Orange County Speedway. In 2014, he scored a victory in the IMSA Cooper Tires Prototype Lites series at Sebring International Raceway.

Sargeant finished second in the Snowball Derby in December 2014, placing runner up to John Hunter Nemechek. In January 2015, Sargeant planned to compete in the 24 Hours of Daytona in the TUDOR United SportsCar Championship, but was declined his competition license by race organizers due to his age and inexperience with sports cars. The race requires that all drivers are 17 years old, while Sargeant was 16 at the time, though exceptions had been made in the past.

Developmental series
For 2015, Sargeant signed with HScott Motorsports to drive the No. 51 Chevrolet SS in the NASCAR K&N Pro Series East, with sponsorship from GALT. He debuted in the series in February 2015 at New Smyrna Speedway with a second-place finish. Sargeant also ran part-time in the K&N Pro Series West, where he scored a victory in the season's first race. In May, Sargeant was named to the 2015 NASCAR Next class. On August 12, 2015, Sargeant announced he would make his Camping World Truck Series debut at the UNOH 200 at Bristol Motor Speedway for Wauters Motorsports.

Sargeant competed in the ARCA Racing Series during the 2016 season. He ran 15 races for Venturini Motorsports with one win, ten top five and twelve top ten finishes. He was named the 2016 ARCA Rookie of the Year.

He signed with Cunningham Motorsports to run the entire 2017 ARCA Racing Series schedule alongside Shane Lee. In the third race of the season, he lapped the field en route to victory at Salem Speedway. He also won at Iowa Speedway and beat Michael Self en route to victory at Lucas Oil Raceway at Indianapolis. Sargeant finished outside of the top ten only twice and finished second in the championship standings to Ken Schrader Racing driver Austin Theriault.

National series
After sporadic appearances in the NASCAR Camping World Truck Series in 2015 and 2017, Sargeant signed with GMS Racing to drive the team's No. 25 truck for a full 2018 season on January 12, 2018. He chose the No. 25 as a tribute to Tim Richmond. Sargeant was approached by Maurice J. Gallagher Jr., owner of GMS, midway through 2017 after winning races in the 2017 ARCA Racing Series season with Cunningham Motorsports. On August 22, 2018 it was announced that he left the team and would be replaced by Spencer Gallagher starting at Mosport (then later on Timothy Peters after Gallagher aggravated his shoulder during a workout) due to "unfortunate circumstances" regarding Sargeant Motorsports.

Personal life
Sargeant was born in Boca Raton, Florida. He is the older brother of Logan Sargeant, who is competing in Formula One for Williams Racing.

Motorsports career results

NASCAR
(key) (Bold – Pole position awarded by qualifying time. Italics – Pole position earned by points standings or practice time. * – Most laps led.)

Camping World Truck Series

K&N Pro Series East

K&N Pro Series West

 Season still in progress
 Ineligible for series points

ARCA Racing Series
(key) (Bold – Pole position awarded by qualifying time. Italics – Pole position earned by points standings or practice time. * – Most laps led.)

Notes

References

External links
 

1998 births
Living people
Sportspeople from Boca Raton, Florida
Racing drivers from Florida
Racing drivers from Miami
NASCAR drivers
American expatriate sportspeople in Switzerland
ARCA Menards Series drivers